George Harvard Cranswick (1882–1954) was the 2nd bishop of Gippsland from 1917 until 1942.

Educated at The King's School, Parramatta, and Sydney University, he was ordained in 1908. In a varied career he was acting vice-principal of  Noble College, Masulipatam, headmaster of the CMS Bezwada, chairman of the Deccan District Church Council and rector of St Paul's, Chatswood before his elevation to the episcopate. After retiring from his diocese, he was chairman of the Australian Board of Missions from 1942 to 1949.

His younger brother, Geoffrey, was the 8th bishop of Tasmania. An eminent author, he died on 25 October 1954.

Notes

1882 births
People educated at The King's School, Parramatta
University of Sydney alumni
Australian Anglican missionaries
Anglican bishops of Gippsland
1954 deaths
20th-century Anglican bishops in Australia
Anglican missionaries in India
Australian expatriates in India